William Henry Arnott (7 April 1873 – 18 May 1962) was a former Australian rules footballer who played with Carlton in the Victorian Football League (VFL).

Notes

External links 

		
Billy Arnott's profile at Blueseum

1873 births
Australian rules footballers from Victoria (Australia)
Richmond Football Club (VFA) players
Carlton Football Club players
1962 deaths